Magnolia grandis is a species of plant in the family Magnoliaceae. It is endemic to China. It is threatened by habitat loss.

References

Flora of China
grandis
Vulnerable plants
Taxonomy articles created by Polbot